Eriochilus dilatatus subsp. dilatatus, commonly known as the white bunny orchid, is a plant in the orchid family Orchidaceae and is endemic to Western Australia. It has a single narrow leaf and up to seven greenish and white flowers with reddish or mauve markings. A widespread and common species, it grows in a range of habitats and flowers prolifically after fire.

Description
The flowers are greenish with reddish markings, except for the lateral sepals which are white. Flowering occurs from March to June.

Taxonomy and naming
The white bunny orchid was first formally described in 1840 by John Lindley who gave it the name Eriochilus latifolius and published the description in A Sketch of the Vegetation of the Swan River Colony. In 1873, George Bentham changed the name to Eriochilus dilatatus var. latifolius and in 2006, Stephen Hopper and Andrew Brown changed the name to E. dilatatus subsp. dilatatus. The specific epithet (dilatatus) is a Latin word meaning "spread out", "enlarge", or "extend".

Distribution and habitat
The swamp bunny orchid grows in woodland, shrubland and in shallow soil on granite outcrops between Dirk Hartog Island and Israelite Bay.

Conservation
Eriochilus dilatatus subsp. dilatatus is classified as "not threatened" by the Western Australian Government Department of Parks and Wildlife.

References

dilatatus
Orchids of Western Australia
Endemic orchids of Australia
Plants described in 1840
Endemic flora of Western Australia